Halle Lynn Bailey (born March 27, 2000) is an American singer-songwriter and actress. She is best known for being one half of the musical duo Chloe x Halle with her sister Chlöe Bailey, together earning five Grammy Award nominations since 2018. Her role as Skyler Forster in the television sitcom Grown-ish has earned her a nomination for Outstanding Supporting Actress in a Comedy Series at the 2020 NAACP Image Awards. She will star in the 2023 film adaptation of The Color Purple, and in the same year will portray Ariel in the 2023 live-action Disney film The Little Mermaid, which is based on the 1989 animated film of the same name, the latter of which being her most notable role.

Early life
Halle Lynn Bailey was born on March 27, 2000, and raised in Mableton, Georgia, with her older sister Chloe Bailey and her younger brother Branson (born October 3, 2005), later moving together to Los Angeles in mid-2012. As children, the sisters began writing their own songs, learning to play instruments through watching YouTube tutorials. Their father and co-manager, Doug Bailey, who "taught [them] to do everything on [their] own," began teaching them how to write songs at the ages of 8 and 10.

Career

2006–2016: Early work and record deal
While in Georgia, Bailey played minor acting roles in films such as Joyful Noise (2012), having begun a career in acting at the age of 3, and the Disney television film Let It Shine (2012). The duo launched a YouTube channel at the ages of 11 and 13 respectively, with a cover of Beyoncé's "Best Thing I Never Had". Their first video to go "viral" was a cover of another of Beyoncé's tracks, Pretty Hurts. They first performed as Chloe x Halle when uploading covers of pop songs onto their channel. The duo made their talk show debut when they appeared on The Ellen Show in April 2012. In 2013, the Bailey sisters won Season 5 of Radio Disney's The Next Big Thing, with them making a cameo appearance in the Disney series Austin & Ally performing the song "Unstoppable" the following September.

In May 2015, both sisters were in talks to sign on with Parkwood Entertainment, with the contracts submitted to the Manhattan Supreme Court, as both sisters were then minors detailing that they "[would] receive at least $60,000 and advances that could total almost $1 million if they make at least six albums." Parkwood Entertainment, which was founded by Beyoncé, finally signed them in 2016 for a five-year contract, becoming "[her] first true musical successors," per NPR, as well as being considered " Beyoncé's prodigies." The Bailey sisters were featured, along with Beyoncé, twin sisters Lisa-Kainde Diaz and Naomi Diaz, Amandla Stenberg and Zendaya in the clip for Freedom in the formermost's eponymous visual album Beyoncé: Lemonade, which premiered on HBO in April 2016.

2016–present: Chloe x Halle

Chloe x Halle made their professional debut with the EP, Sugar Symphony, which was released under Parkwood on April 29, 2016. The duo were also featured as the opening act for the European part of Beyoncé's Formation World Tour, held between late June and early August 2016.

Nearly a year after, the duo released their critically acclaimed mixtape, The Two of Us, on March 16, 2017. The mixtape was featured on Rolling Stone magazine's Best R&B Albums of 2017 list. On December 29, 2017, the duo released the theme song for the TV series Grown-ish, entitled "Grown". Halle played Skylar "Sky" Forster in a recurring capacity in the first season before being upgraded to series regular starting with the second. She departed the series at the end of the fourth season, when her character graduated from college.
Both "Grown" and "The Kids Are Alright" served as the lead and second singles respectively of Chloe x Halle's debut studio album, The Kids Are Alright, which they announced in late February 2018. The album was paired with a visual. Chloe x Halle released their debut studio album, The Kids Are Alright, on March 23, 2018, to critical acclaim. Their single, "Warrior", appeared on both the soundtrack for the film A Wrinkle in Time (2018), as well as their debut album.

On May 31, 2018, it was announced that they would be the opening act for the U.S. leg of Beyoncé and Jay-Z's On the Run II Tour, alongside DJ Khaled. The duo were nominated for two Grammy Awards in December 2018, namely Best New Artist and Best Urban Contemporary Album (for The Kids Are Alright).

On February 3, 2019, Chloe x Halle's performance of "America the Beautiful" at the Super Bowl LIII was praised by their mentor Beyoncé in addition to several news publications. A week later, on February 10, 2019, the duo honored American musician Donny Hathaway by performing his 1972 single "Where Is the Love" at the 61st Annual Grammy Awards.

On June 12, 2020, the duo released their anticipated sophomore album, Ungodly Hour, to critical acclaim. The album debuted at number 16 on the Billboard 200 chart with 24,000 units sold. "Do It" also became their first entry on the Billboard Hot 100, debuting at number 83, on the chart dated June 27, 2020.

Chloe x Halle performed the American national anthem at the kickoff game for the 2020 NFL season in September 2020. The duo hosted the Glamour Women of the Year Awards in October 2020. In November 2020, they received nominations for Album of the Year, Song of the Year, Video of the Year, Best Dance Performance and The Ashford And Simpson Songwriter's Award at the 2020 Soul Train Music Awards. They also received nominations for Best Progressive R&B Album, Best R&B Song and Best Traditional R&B Performance at the forthcoming 63rd Annual Grammy Awards. They  performed "Baby Girl" at the 2020 Billboard Women in Music ceremony, where Beyoncé presented them with the Rising Star Award.

2019–present: Solo endeavors
On July 3, 2019, Disney announced that Bailey had been cast as Princess Ariel in the upcoming live-action remake of The Little Mermaid, set to be directed by Rob Marshall. She will also record and perform the soundtrack for the film. Director Rob Marshall said in a statement "After an extensive search, it was abundantly clear that Halle possesses that rare combination of spirit, heart, youth, innocence, and substance—plus a glorious singing voice—all intrinsic qualities necessary to play this iconic role", Bailey's casting as Ariel caused controversy, with some claiming that casting an African-American in the role of Ariel was unfaithful to the original character. Disney responded to the public with an open letter defending their casting. Jodi Benson, Ariel's original voice actress, also defended the casting of Bailey saying, "the most important thing is to tell the story" and that "the spirit of a character is what really matters".

On October 1, 2021, Bailey made her debut solo performance with a rendition of the Disney song "Can You Feel the Love Tonight", in the televised event, The Most Magical Story on Earth: 50 Years of Walt Disney World, which celebrated Disney World's 50th Anniversary.

Artistry

Influences
Bailey's musical influences came from jazz and listening to Billie Holiday from a young age. She has cited the singer as one of the major influences on her vocals. In addition to her singing, she plays the guitar.

Personal life
Bailey's pastimes include swimming, running and biking as well as making beaded earrings and necklaces, which she started selling on Etsy in April 2021, and the following May, she adopted a cat named Poseidon. Bailey resides in North Hollywood, Los Angeles with her sister. In December 2021, she began dating rapper and YouTuber DDG.

Discography

With Chloe x Halle

Studio albums
 The Kids Are Alright (2018)
 Ungodly Hour (2020)

Filmography

Film

Television

Music videos
 "All Night" – (2016)
 "Drop" – (2016)
 "Fall" – (2016)
 "Grown" – (2017)
 "The Kids Are Alright" – (2018)
 "Warrior" – (2018)
 "Happy Without Me" – (2018)
 "Shine Bright" – (2018)
 "Cool People" – (2018)
 "Who Knew" – (2019)
 "Catch Up" – (2020)
 "Do It" – (2020)
 "Forgive Me" – (2020)
 "Ungodly Hour" – (2021)
 "If I Want You" – (2022)
 "It's Givin" – (2022)

Awards and nominations

References

External links

2000 births
Living people
Chloe x Halle
21st-century American actresses
21st-century American women singers
Actresses from Atlanta
African-American actresses
African-American child actresses
American child actresses
African-American female dancers
African-American women singers
African-American songwriters
American women singer-songwriters
American film actresses
American television actresses
American contemporary R&B singers
Musicians from Atlanta
People from Mableton, Georgia
Singer-songwriters from Georgia (U.S. state)